Murders in the Rue Morgue is a 1971 American horror film directed by Gordon Hessler, starring Jason Robards, Christine Kaufmann, Herbert Lom, and Lilli Palmer. It is a loose adaptation of Edgar Allan Poe's 1841 short story of the same name, although it departs from the story in several significant aspects, at times more resembling Gaston Leroux's The Phantom of the Opera.  In an interview on the film's DVD, Hessler said that he felt it necessary to reinvent the plot as he believed the majority of audiences were too familiar with Poe's story.

Plot
In early-20th century Paris, a theatre troupe is specializing in gory, naturalistic horror plays in the fashion of the Grand Guignol, under the direction of Cesar Charron.

The director, Cesar Charron (Jason Robards), is presenting Poe's "The Murders in the Rue Morgue".  Cesar's wife, the actress Madeline (Christine Kaufmann), whose mother (Lilli Palmer) had been murdered by axe, is haunted by nightmares of an axe-wielding man. Then, suddenly, Rene Marot (Herbert Lom), a former lover of Madeline's mother thought long dead after being horribly disfigured on stage, mysteriously returns and begins murdering members and ex-members of the acting troupe, confounding the Paris police, who initially suspect Cesar.

Cast

Production

Development
Gordon Hessler was hired to direct the film. Hessler said that he felt the story was so familiar it needed to be changed, so he and writer Christopher Wicking decided to do it as a play-within-a-play, with a mystery happening around a theatre that was putting on a production of "The Murders in the Rue Morgue". The new storyline borrowed plot elements of The Phantom of the Opera.

Casting
Hessler said that Vincent Price "was very upset that he wasn't in" the film "but I had nothing to with that." He thought that Price was having contractual fights with American International Pictures (AIP) at the time. Hessler said that AIP hired Jason Robards "because of his name, and he was quite well respected. Most actors like to play a horror part at some point in their life, so he was brought onboard."

Filming
Filming started October 1970. The film was shot in Toledo and Madrid, Spain. Hessler commented that it was easier to film there, as "You couldn't shoot that in London unless you built sets."

Hessler said that Robards was "fine to work with" but, two weeks into filming, he told Hessler that he had the wrong part and wanted to be doing the other part. Hessler would have been happy to give him the other role, but by then it was too late. "It's always the monster who gets the best part in a horror picture, it's much more juicy", said Hessler.

"We may have had too much fun", said Robards after production. "It's hard to tell."

Release
Murders in the Rue Morgue was released in the United States in the summer of 1971, premiering in Philadelphia on July 21. Hessler said that James H. Nicholson liked the film when he saw it in Spain. The director says he felt "it was one of the best films I had ever made." However, the film was drastically edited in the United States. Hessler said that he was "appalled when I originally saw the theatrically released version." He wrote a five-page letter to Samuel Arkoff complaining about the changes made, but by then the film was already in release.

Among the changes that Hessler disliked were removing a sequence from the end of the film and tinting the flashback scenes. "The whole idea was not to tint them so that you wouldn't know when you're more or less in a dream sequence or just being puzzled by it," said Hessler. "The whole trick in that was instead of it being a flashback, this would be a flash-forward, which people really hadn't done before at that time. It was a premonition of what was going to happen. When it's tinted, it's just so obvious. Audiences picked up on it immediately." AIP also removed a lot of Lilli Palmer's scenes. "She was vital to the plot and by cutting her scenes down, it was like she was an extra in the film", said Hessler.

Robards later called the film "a disaster... but I got a good price and part of the picture."

Critical response

Murders in the Rue Morgue received mixed to negative reviews from critics. Leonard Maltin panned the film, awarding the film 1 1/2 out of 4 stars. Howard Thompson from The New York Times gave the film a positive review, praising the film's direction, costume design, color, and performances. Thompson did, however, note that the film's ending, while sound, was fairly predictable.
Donald Guarisco from Allmovie gave the film a negative review, criticizing the film's substandard pacing, convoluted plot, performances, and lack of actual tension, writing "This riff on the famous Edgar Allen  Poe story has an intriguing, experimental edge to it but is not fully successful at reinventing the Poe subgenre".

Home media
The film was released on DVD as a double feature with Cry of the Banshee on April 15, 2003.

Scream Factory released the film as a double feature on Blu-ray with The Dunwich Horror (1970) in 2016. This edition went out-of-print in May 2020.

See also
 List of American films of 1971

References

Sources

External links 
 
 
 
 

1971 films
1971 horror films
Films based on The Murders in the Rue Morgue
American horror films
Films directed by Gordon Hessler
Films shot in Madrid
1970s English-language films
1970s American films